Darti (also Romanized as Dārtī; also known as Dār-e Tūt and Dār Tūt) is a village in Shirvan Rural District, in the Central District of Borujerd County, Lorestan Province, Iran. At the 2006 census, its population was 432, in 107 families.

References 

Towns and villages in Borujerd County